Fast Track is a 30-minute travel news TV show which was broadcast on BBC World News. Individual segments were also broadcast on BBC News Channel.

Presenters
The programme was presented by Rajan Datar and Fiona Foster. There were also regular segments including Widget of the Week, Events and the Best of the Web.

Other presenters included: Simon Calder, Akhtar Khan, Michelle Jana-Chan and Carmen Roberts. Both Datar and Roberts are amongst the main presenters on the successor programme; with Calder presenting a viewer questions segment.

References

External links
 

2013 British television series debuts
2014 British television series endings
2010s British travel television series
English-language television shows
BBC Television shows
BBC World News shows